The  was an infantry division of the Imperial Japanese Army. It was formed 12 April 1945 in Daya Bay as a type C(hei) security division, simultaneously with the 129th division. The nucleus for the formation was the parts of the 19th Independent Mixed Brigade.

Action
The 93rd infantry brigade was garrisoning Zhongshan while 94th infantry brigade (organized 5 May 1945) was garrisoning Shantou.

Parts of the 130th division were sent to Shunde District for labour in October 1945. The bulk of 130th division was evacuated back to Japan in March - April 1946, arriving to Tanabe, Wakayama and Kagoshima.　
The headquarters of the 130th division have departed Port of Humen 26 March 1946, arrived to Uraga, Kanagawa 2 April 1946, and were dissolved 5 April 1946.

See also
 List of Japanese Infantry Divisions
Independent Mixed Brigades (Imperial Japanese Army)

Notes and references
This article incorporates material from Japanese Wikipedia page 第130師団 (日本軍), accessed 5 July 2016
 Madej, W. Victor, Japanese Armed Forces Order of Battle, 1937–1945 [2 vols], Allentown, PA: 1981.

Japanese World War II divisions
Infantry divisions of Japan
Military units and formations established in 1945
Military units and formations disestablished in 1946
1945 establishments in Japan
1946 disestablishments in Japan